HMS Hannibal was originally planned as a 90-gun second rate ship of the line, to be built at Woolwich Dockyard.  She was ordered on 14 May 1840, but cancelled and re-ordered. This ship was also named HMS Hannibal, and utilised the new screw propulsion technology.  She was a 91-gun second rate, built at Deptford Dockyard by Charles Willcox, Master Shipwright, and launched on 31 January 1854.  She served in the Crimean War, commanded by John Charles Dalrymple Hay.

She was used to transport Garibaldi's soldiers in Italy.  The ship arrived in Naples in July 1860.  In November a smallpox epidemic broke out, and in ten days 90 men from this ship and at least one other had caught the disease.  Seven of those who died were buried in the English Cemetery, Naples.

She was hulked in 1874 and finally broken up in 1904, after 50 years in service.

External links

References

 

Ships of the line of the Royal Navy
1854 ships